Félix François Faure (30 January 1841 – 16 February 1899) was the President of France from 1895 until his death in 1899. A native of Paris, he worked as a tanner in his younger years. Faure became a member of the Chamber of Deputies for Seine-Inférieure in 1881. He rose to prominence in national politics up until unexpectedly assuming the presidency, during which time France's relations with Russia improved. Writer Émile Zola's famous J'Accuse…! open letter was written to Faure in L'Aurore in 1898 in the course of the Dreyfus affair. Faure's state funeral at Notre-Dame Cathedral on 23 February 1899 was the scene of an attempted coup d'état led by French nationalist poet Paul Déroulède, who was later exiled to Spain.

Biography
Félix François Faure was born in Paris, the son of a maker of small furniture pieces Jean-Marie Faure (1809–1889) and his first wife, Rose Cuissard (1819–1852). 

Having started as a tanner and merchant at Le Havre, Faure acquired considerable wealth, was elected to the National Assembly on 21 August 1881, and took his seat as a member of the Left, interesting himself chiefly in matters concerning economics, railways and the navy. In November 1882, he became under-secretary for the colonies in Ferry's ministry, and retained that post till 1885. He held the same post in Tirard's ministry in 1888, and in 1893 was made vice-president of the chamber.

In 1894, he obtained cabinet rank as minister of marine in the administration of Charles Dupuy. In the following January, he was unexpectedly elected President of the Republic upon the resignation of President Casimir-Perier. The principal cause of his elevation was the determination of the various sections of the moderate republican party to exclude Henri Brisson, who had had a plurality of votes on the first ballot, but had failed to obtain an absolute majority. To accomplish this end, it was necessary to unite the party, and such unity could be secured only by the nomination of someone who offended no one. Faure answered this description exactly.

He granted amnesty to the anarchist movements in 1895, enabling the return from exile in England of several famous anarchists, such as Émile Pouget.

In 1898 (and for the first few years of the following century), the French automobile industry was the largest in the world. President Faure was not impressed. Invited to address industry leaders at what, in retrospect, is recorded as the first Paris Motor Show, Faure told his audience, "Your cars are very ugly and they smell very bad" ("").

His fine presence and his tact on ceremonial occasions rendered the state some service when he received the Tsar at Paris in 1896, and in 1897 returned his visit, after which meeting the Franco-Russian Alliance was publicly announced again. This drew against him the criticism of pro-Dreyfus intellectuals and politicians, such as Émile Zola and Georges Clemenceau.

Freemasonry
Félix Faure was initiated in Le Havre, at "L'aménité", a lodge of Grand Orient de France, on 25 October 1865.

Death

In 1897, Faure met Marguerite Steinheil, who became his mistress. Faure died suddenly at the age of 58 from apoplexy in the Élysée Palace on 16 February 1899, while engaged in sexual activities in his office with the then 30-year-old Marguerite Steinheil. It has been reported that Felix Faure had his fatal seizure while Steinheil was performing oral sex on him, but the exact nature of their sexual activities is unknown and such reports may have stemmed from various  (puns) made up afterward by his political opponents.

One such pun was to nickname Madame Steinheil . Georges Clemenceau's epitaph of Faure, in the same trend, was ""; Clemenceau, who was also editor of the newspaper , wrote that "upon entering the void, he [Faure] must have felt at home". After his death, some alleged extracts from his private journals, dealing with French policy, were published in the Paris press.

In popular culture
The French barque President Felix Faure, named for the President, was involved in a 1908 case of shipwreck at the Antipodes Islands, south of New Zealand, the survivors being stranded for sixty days before being rescued.

Faure's liaison with Marguerite Steinheil was the subject of the film The President's Mistress (2009) broadcast on Eurochannel, with Cristiana Reali in Steinheil's role, and was referenced in the opening episode of the television series, Paris Police 1900 (2021), with Évelyne Brochu as Steinheil.

See also

 Félix Faure (Paris Métro), a station on line 8 of the Paris Métro
 Si-Mustapha, a town in Algeria formerly named Félix-Faure

Notes

References

External links

 

 
 

|-
 
 

1841 births
1899 deaths
19th-century presidents of France
19th-century Princes of Andorra
Burials at Père Lachaise Cemetery
Deaths from bleeding
French Freemasons
Knights of the Golden Fleece of Spain
Members of the 3rd Chamber of Deputies of the French Third Republic
Members of the 4th Chamber of Deputies of the French Third Republic
Members of the 5th Chamber of Deputies of the French Third Republic
Members of the 6th Chamber of Deputies of the French Third Republic
Ministers of Marine
Politicians from Paris
Progressive Republicans (France)
Republican Union (France) politicians